Nikola Ljubičić (Serbian Cyrillic: Никола Љубичић; 4 April 1916 – 13 April 2005) was the President of the Presidency of Serbia (1982–1984), a member of the Presidency of the Socialist Federal Republic of Yugoslavia (1984–1989), and the Minister of Defence of Yugoslavia (1967–1982). He received numerous medals both from Yugoslavia and abroad, including the Order of the National Hero of Yugoslavia.

Biography
Ljubičić was born in the village of Karan, near Užice. He fought in World War II alongside Josip Broz Tito for the Yugoslav partisan movement and was proclaimed a Yugoslav national hero on the 27 November 1953 for his actions in the war.

Nikola Ljubičić joined the Partisans at the start of the war in Yugoslavia in 1941. He served with distinction, courage and heroism in the face of death. During the war he was put in charge of numerous units, moving through the ranks of the Partisan army. Forty-one years after his first steps upon the battlefields of Yugoslavia, he retired from the Yugoslav People's Army as a four-star General of the Army and Minister of Defence.

In 1982 Nikola Ljubičić took up the position of President of the Presidency of Serbia. He remained in this position until 1984. From 1984 to 1989 he was a member of the Presidency of the Socialist Federal Republic of Yugoslavia.

He died in Belgrade on 13 April 2005, aged 89, and was buried with full military honors in the Alley of Distinguished Citizens of the New Cemetery in Belgrade.

There are a number of publications on his work such as the Total National Defence – Strategy for Peace (published in 1977 in numerous languages, including English, Arabic, Russian and Serbo-Croatian), and his own memoirs of World War II in the book "U Titovoj koloni" ("Marching with Tito"; published in 2006).

See also
Organization of the League of Communists in the Yugoslav People's Army

References

1916 births
2005 deaths
Military personnel from Užice
Yugoslav generals
Yugoslav Partisans members
Presidents of Serbia within Yugoslavia
Recipients of the Order of the People's Hero
League of Communists of Serbia politicians
Generals of the Yugoslav People's Army
Burials at Belgrade New Cemetery
Central Committee of the League of Communists of Yugoslavia members
League of Communists – Movement for Yugoslavia politicians
Government ministers of Yugoslavia
Recipients of the Order of the Hero of Socialist Labour